Kingpin is a 2000 blues album by Tinsley Ellis. It was recorded at Ocean Way by David Z (also the producer) who also mixed at Javelina Recording Studio (both in Nashville, Tennessee) for Supersonic Productions. It was mastered by George Marino at Sterling Sound New York. Tinsley wrote/co-wrote three of the songs.

Track listing
 "Heart Fixing Business" (Homer Banks/Allen Jones)
 "Sweet Pea" (Wayne Burdette/Tinsley Ellis)
 "Dyin' to Do Wrong" (Ellis)
 "Can't Play That Way" (Ellis)
 "I've Got to Use My Imagination" (Gerry Goffin/Barry Goldberg)
 "I Got to Moan" (S. Boyer)
 "I'll Be Loving You" (J.L. Williams)
 "The Other Side of Town" (Sir Mack Rice/Jon Tiven/Sally Tiven)
 "Days of Old" (B.B. King/Josea Taub)
 "Slingshots and Boomerangs" (C.C. Adcock/David Eagan)
 "Let's Think About It" (Arthur Alexander/Jon Tiven)

Musicians
Tinsley Ellis on Guitar and vocals
David Smith on Bass guitar  
Reese Wynans on keyboards 
Jack Holder on guitar 
Richie Hayward on drums 
Kevin McKendree on organ
David Z on guitar, keyboards, percussion 
Little Joey Hoegger on harmonica
Jim Hoke on saxophone

References
Allmusic "Kingpin"

External links
Tinsley Ellis website

2000 albums
Tinsley Ellis albums